Simon Farnaby (born 2 April 1973) is an English actor, comedian and writer. He is a member of the British Horrible Histories troupe in which he starred in the television series Horrible Histories, Yonderland and Ghosts. He has written and appeared in films such as Mindhorn and Paddington 2, and in the BBC sitcom Detectorists.

Early life
Farnaby was born on 2 April 1973 in Darlington, County Durham and attended Richmond School, North Yorkshire.

Career 
Farnaby is a long-time member of The Mighty Boosh supporting cast, having had roles both in their series and co-starring in the quasi-spinoff film Bunny and the Bull. He is also well known for his similarly offbeat characters in the CBBC live-action series of Horrible Histories, such as Caligula and the Grim Reaper. Other notable television work includes a recurring role on the sitcom Jam & Jerusalem and co-starring as eccentric neighbour Sloman on The Midnight Beast'''s TV series. He previously had a very brief role in Coronation Street in the 1990s.

Along with journalist Scott Murray, Farnaby co-wrote The Phantom of the Open, a biography of Maurice Flitcroft, a would-be professional golfer whose unsuccessful attempts to qualify for the Open Championship led to his being described as "the world's worst golfer". The book was published in 2010.

Along with the five other principal members of the cast of Horrible Histories, Farnaby is also the co-creator, writer and star of Yonderland, an eight-part family fantasy comedy series that premiered on Sky One on 10 November 2013. The show ended in 2016, with three series and a Christmas special. He co-starred with the same troupe in Bill, a 2015 BBC comedy film based loosely around the early life of William Shakespeare.

In 2013, Farnaby presented a documentary entitled Richard III: The King in the Car Park, tracing the discovery and identification of the remains of the last Plantagenet king. The next year, Farnaby presented another Channel 4 documentary series entitled Man Vs Weird, in which he travelled the world investigating people who claim superhuman abilities.

In 2014, Farnaby narrated a series on Channel 5 called On the Yorkshire Buses, following East Yorkshire Motor Services.

In 2016, Farnaby co-wrote Mindhorn with Julian Barratt, a comedy about Richard Thorncroft (Barratt), a faded television actor drawn into negotiations with a criminal who believes his character Detective Mindhorn is real. Farnaby also has a small acting role as Clive Parnevik. 

In 2016, Farnaby had a small role in Rogue One, as an X-Wing pilot.

In 2017, Farnaby stated that he was working on a film script based on his biography of Maurice Flitcroft. The film The Phantom of the Open was released in 2021.

In 2017, Farnaby co-wrote Paddington 2 with Paul King. Farnaby had a small role in both the first film and its sequel, before subsequently appearing alongside Paddington Bear and Queen Elizabeth II in a short film broadcast as a part of the celebrations for the Queen's Platinum Jubilee in June 2022.

In 2020, Farnaby wrote The Wizard In My Shed.

In 2021, Farnaby and King were reported to have to signed on to co-write, with King directing, Wonka, a prequel based on the novel Charlie and the Chocolate Factory'' by Roald Dahl.

Personal life
Farnaby is married to actress Claire Keelan (his second wife) with whom he has a daughter, Eve, born in 2014.

Filmography

Film

Television

References

External links

 Simon Farnaby on The Spotlight

1973 births
Living people
20th-century English male actors
21st-century English male actors
Actors from County Durham
English male comedians
English male film actors
English male television actors
People from Darlington